The Rural Municipality of Wilton No. 472 is a rural municipality (RM) in the Canadian province of Saskatchewan within Census Division No. 17 and  Division No. 6. It is located in the west-central portion of the province.

History 
The RM of Wilton No. 472 incorporated as a rural municipality on December 13, 1909.

Demographics 

Geography

Communities and localities 
The following urban municipalities are surrounded by or adjacent to the RM.

Cities
 Lloydminster

Towns
 Lashburn

Villages
 Marshall

The following unincorporated communities are within the RM.

Organized hamlets
 Lone Rock

Government 
The RM of Wilton No. 472 is governed by an elected municipal council and an appointed administrator that meets on the third Thursday of every month. The reeve of the RM is Glen Dow while its administrator is Darren Elder. The RM's office is located in Marshall.

References

External links 

Wilton
Wilton No. 472, Saskatchewan
Division No. 17, Saskatchewan